G.657 is an international standard developed by the  Standardization Sector of the International Telecommunication Union (ITU-T) that specifies single-mode optical fiber (SMF) cable.

History 
The G.657 Recommendation builds on a previous fiber optic specification in G.652.

G.657 was first published in 2006. Revisions of the standard were since published in 2009, 2012, and 2016 (November).

References 

ITU-T recommendations
ITU-T G Series Recommendations